Happy Together is an American television sitcom created by Tim McAuliffe and Austen Earl, that aired on CBS from October 1, 2018 to January 14, 2019. The series follows a young couple whose lives are suddenly thrown into chaos when a pop star moves into their home. It stars Damon Wayans Jr., Amber Stevens West, Felix Mallard, Stephnie Weir, Victor Williams and Chris Parnell.

On May 10, 2019, CBS cancelled the series after one season.

Premise
Happy Together follows "Jake and Claire, a thirty something couple who are tired of their mundane life and start to reconnect with their younger, cooler selves when an emerging pop star, who is drawn to their super-normal suburban life, moves in."

Cast and characters

Main
 Damon Wayans Jr. as Jake Davis, an accountant in the entertainment industry who has Cooper James as a client.
 Amber Stevens West as Claire Davis, a restaurant and bar designer and Jake's wife.
 Stephnie Weir as Bonnie, a retired doctor and Claire's mother.
 Victor Williams as Gerald, a retired doctor and Claire's father.
 Chris Parnell as Wayne, a talent manager and Jake's colleague who also works for Cooper.
 Felix Mallard as Cooper James, an up-and-coming pop star and client of Jake's.

Recurring
 Winston James Francis as Nightmare, Cooper's bodyguard.

Guest
 Peyton List as Sierra Quinn ("Pilot"), an actress and ex-girlfriend of Cooper's.
 Mary Holland as Suzanne ("Pilot"), an assistant of Sierra's whom she refers to as "Alexa".
 James Corden as himself ("Pilot"), the host of The Late Late Show with James Corden who mentions Cooper and Sierra's break-up in his opening monologue.
 Pia Mia as Rylie Conners ("Pilot"), a woman Cooper dates while broken up with Sierra.
 Betsy Sodaro as Donna ("Scrubbing"), a thrift store employee that helps Cooper retrieve all of Jake and Claire's donated items.
 Anders Holm as Antoine ("Let's Work It Out"), Cooper's workout coach.
 Damon Wayans as Mike Davis ("Like Father, Like Son"), an accountant for the Boston Celtics and Jake's father.
 Steve-O as S10CIL ("Bland Gestures"), a tattoo artist.
 Ben Simmons as himself ("Bland Gestures"), an NBA star who plays a charity game with Jake.
 Sam Lloyd as Gene Johnston ("Til Death Do We Party"), a podiatrist and Jake and Claire's neighbor.

Episodes

Production

Development
On January 31, 2018, it was announced that CBS had given the production a pilot order. The episode was written by Tim McAuliffe and Austen Earl who were expected to executive produce alongside Ben Winston, Michael Rotenberg, and Jonathan Berry. Production companies involved with the pilot include Fulwell 73, 3 Arts Entertainment, and CBS Television Studios. On May 9, 2018, CBS officially ordered the pilot to series. A few days later, it was announced that the series, now titled Happy Together, would premiere in the fall of 2018 and air on Mondays at 8:30 P.M. On July 9, 2018, it was announced that the series would premiere on October 1, 2018.

On November 28, 2018, it was announced that CBS had declined to order additional episodes of the series beyond the initial order of thirteen, and that its timeslot on their schedule would be filled by the third season of Man with a Plan.  On May 10, 2019, CBS canceled the series after a single season.

Casting
In February 2018, it was announced that Damon Wayans Jr. and Felix Mallard had been cast in the pilot's lead roles. In March 2018, it was reported that Chris Parnell and Amber Stevens West had also joined the pilot's main cast. On June 22, 2018, it was announced that Victor Williams had been cast to replace Tim Meadows in the recurring role of Gerald, West's character's father. Meadows was forced to drop out of the role after the series Schooled, which he had in first position against Happy Together, was picked up to series by ABC.

Release

Marketing
On May 16, 2018, CBS released the first official trailer for the series.

Premiere
On September 12, 2018, the series took part in the 12th annual PaleyFest Fall Television Previews which featured a preview screening of the series and a conversation with cast members including Damon Wayans Jr., Amber Stevens West, and Felix Mallard.

Reception

Critical response
The series has been met with a mixed response from critics upon its premiere. On the review aggregation website Rotten Tomatoes, the series holds an approval rating of 53% with an average rating of 5.17 out of 10, based on 19 reviews. The website's critical consensus reads, "Happy Togethers premise won't win many points for originality, but the show still earns laughs thanks to a winning trio of central performances." Metacritic, which uses a weighted average, assigned the series a score of 48 out of 100 based on 9 critics, indicating "mixed or average reviews".

Ratings

Home media 
The complete series of Happy Together was released on DVD on March 2, 2021, via DeepDiscount.

References

External links

2010s American sitcoms
2018 American television series debuts
2019 American television series endings
CBS original programming
English-language television shows
Television series about marriage
Television series by 3 Arts Entertainment
Television series by CBS Studios